MASTL  is an official symbol provided by HGNC for human gene whose official name is micro tubule associated serine/threonine kinase like. This gene is 32,1 kbps long. This gene is also known as GW, GWL, THC2, MAST-L, GREATWALL. This is present in mainly mammalian cells like human, house mouse, cattle, monkey, etc. It is in the 10th chromosome of the mammalian nucleus. Recent studies have been carried on zebrafish and frogs.  This gene encodes for the protein micro tubule associated serine/threonine kinase and its sub-classes.

Micro-tubule-associated serine/threonine protein kinase is a mammalian enzyme which was first discovered in Drosophila as an essential kinase (great wall) for correct chromosome condensation and mitotic progression. The EC number for this enzyme is 2.7.11.12. This enzyme is active during mitotic division and is mainly localized in the nucleus during interphase. They get dispersed into the cytoplasm upon the degradation of nuclear envelope during mitosis. The MASTL depleted cells are delayed by RNAi in G2 phase and show a decreased condensation of the chromosomes. RNAi cells which pass through the mitosis, might not get separated into their sister chromatids in anaphase. This causes the chromatin to be trapped in the cleavage furrow and form 4N G1 cells due to cytokinesis failure. This enzyme enhances the cyclin B1-Cdk1-dependent mitotic phosphorylation events during mitosis.

Although Mastl kinase is not essential for metaphase entry, it is required for its maintenance by sustaining spindle assembly checkpoint signaling. Suppression of protein phosphatase 2A activity by Mastl/Arpp19/ENSA pathway leads to sustained high level of Cdk1 substrate phosphorylation until anaphase. It also provides the timely activation of APC/C during Meiosis I and Cdk1 reactivation in meiosis II.

Mutation in the gene

A missense mutation in the MASTL gene can lead to an autosomal dominant inherited thrombocytopenia. The mutation is due to the change in amino acid glutamic acid at 167 to aspartic acid. Common phenotype of a mild thrombocytopenia patient is the decrease average plate counts of 60,000 platelets per ml of blood.

Uses in the therapeutic field

MASTL enzyme is also used for therapeutic applications such as cancer progression and tumor recurrence after free cancer therapy and this enzyme can be of higher value in the therapeutic market.

References

Further reading